Iri may refer to:
 Iri-ye Olya
 Iri-ye Sofla